The following is a list of players and who appeared in at least one game for the St. Louis Terriers franchise of the Federal League, which existed from  until .

Keys

List of players

External links
St. Louis Terriers batters from Baseball Reference
St. Louis Terriers pitchers from Baseball Reference

Major League Baseball all-time rosters